The Tebi–Towe languages are a pair of closely related languages of New Guinea, namely Tebi (Dubu) and Towei.

References

 
West Pauwasi languages